Mohammed Azharuddeen (born 22 March 1994) is an Indian cricketer who plays for Kerala in domestic cricket. He is a right-handed wicket-keeper-batter.

Early life
Azharuddeen was born on 22 March 1994 in Thalangara in Kasaragod district of Kerala to BK Moidu and Nabeesa. He was the youngest of eight brothers. He was named after the former Indian captain Mohammad Azharuddin by his elder brother. Following the footsteps of his brothers who have all played district level cricket, Azharuddeen started playing cricket when he was 9. He lost his mother when he was 16 and his father when he was 20.

Domestic career
Azharuddeen made his first-class debut on 15 November 2015 in the 2015–16 Ranji Trophy. He made his List A debut on 10 December 2015 in the 2015–16 Vijay Hazare Trophy. He made his Twenty20 debut on 2 January 2016 in the 2015–16 Syed Mushtaq Ali Trophy.

In August 2018, he was one of five players that were suspended for three games in the 2018–19 Vijay Hazare Trophy, after showing dissent against Kerala's captain, Sachin Baby.

On 13 January 2021, in the 2020–21 Syed Mushtaq Ali Trophy, Azharuddeen became the first T20 centurion for Kerala as he hammered a 37-ball ton against Mumbai. It was also the second-fastest century in the Syed Mushtaq Ali Trophy and joint third-fastest by an Indian batsman. His final score of 137 off 54 deliveries was also the third-highest score in the tournament.

Indian Premier League

In February 2021, Azharuddeen was bought by the Royal Challengers Bangalore in the IPL auction ahead of the 2021 Indian Premier League. However, he went unsold in the 2022 auction.

References

External links
 

1994 births
Living people
Indian cricketers
Kerala cricketers
People from Kasaragod district
Cricketers from Kerala
Wicket-keepers